Destan Norman (born December 5, 1998) is an American soccer player who currently plays for Northern Colorado Hailstorm in USL League One.

Career

Youth 
Norman attended Fort Collins High School, playing on the team as a freshman, finishing as a Colorado State semi-finalist in 2013. Norman also played club soccer for Arsenal Colorado up to 2014, and USSDA side Real Colorado between 2014 and 2017. Norman was a State Cup semi-finalist with Arsenal Colorado in 2014.

College
In 2017, Norman attended the University of Denver to play college soccer. In four years with the Pioneers, Norman made 81 appearances, scoring three goals and tallying six assists. During his time at Denver, Norman was named Summit League Second Team in 2021, CoSIDA Academic All District in 2018, and also received academic all-league honors in four straight seasons.

Professional 
Norman signed with USL League One expansion club Northern Colorado Hailstorm in April 2022. He made his debut for Northern Colorado on April 6, 2021, starting in a 1–0 win after extra-time in the Lamar Hunt U.S. Open Cup against Colorado Springs Switchbacks.

References

External links 
 Denver profile

1998 births
Living people
American soccer players
Association football midfielders
Denver Pioneers men's soccer players
Northern Colorado Hailstorm FC players
People from Fort Collins, Colorado
Soccer players from Colorado
USL League One players